The 2007–08 Crown Prince Cup was the 33rd season of the Saudi premier knockout tournament since its establishment in 1957. It started with the Qualifying Rounds on 29 November 2007 and concluded with the final on 7 March 2008.

Premier League side Al-Ahli were the defending champions, but they were eliminated by Al-Ettifaq in the semi-finals. Al-Hilal won their seventh Crown Prince Cup title after defeating Al-Ettifaq 2–0 in the final.

Qualifying rounds
All of the competing teams that are not members of the Premier League competed in the qualifying rounds to secure one of 4 available places in the Round of 16. The qualifying competition began on 29 November 2007.

First round

The First Round matches were played on 29 November 2007.

Second round
The Second Round matches were played on 6 December 2007.

Final round
The Final Round matches were played on 12 December 2007.

Bracket

Round of 16
The Round of 16 fixtures were played on 8 and 9 February 2008. All times are local, AST (UTC+3).

Quarter-finals
The quarter-finals fixtures were played on 13 and 14 February 2008. All times are local, AST (UTC+3).

Semi-finals
The semi-finals first legs were played on 26 and 27 February 2008 while the second legs were played on 1 and 2 March 2008. All times are local, AST (UTC+3).

|}

Matches

Al-Hilal won 1–0 on aggregate.

Al-Ettifaq won 4–3 on aggregate.

Final

The final was held on 7 March 2008 in the King Fahd International Stadium in Riyadh. All times are local, AST (UTC+3).

Top goalscorers
As of 7 March 2008

See also
 2007–08 Saudi Premier League

References

Saudi Crown Prince Cup seasons
2007–08 domestic association football cups
Crown Prince Cup